Westside Park is located in Paterson, Passaic County, New Jersey, United States. It is home to the Van Houten House, which was built in 1831. It was added to the National Register of Historic Places on March 7, 1973.

See also
National Register of Historic Places listings in Passaic County, New Jersey

References

Houses completed in 1831
Houses on the National Register of Historic Places in New Jersey
Houses in Passaic County, New Jersey
National Register of Historic Places in Passaic County, New Jersey
New Jersey Register of Historic Places
Geography of Paterson, New Jersey